Jacques Danka Longa (born 26 July 1961) is the third and current Roman Catholic bishop of the Roman Catholic Diocese of Kara, Togo.

Born in Sokodé, he studied physics at the University of Lomé before entering the Grand séminaire Saint-Gall de Ouidah, Benin, where he obtained a baccalaureat in theology. Following his ordination to the priesthood on 25 January 1992, he was appointed spiritual director and lecturer at the Séminaire interdiocésain Saint-Paul de Notsé in the Diocese of Kpalimé. 
After this, he continued his studies in theology at the Pontifical Urban University, Rome where he specialised in Canon Law. In 2003, he was named rector of the Grand séminaire interdiocésain Jean-Paul II, Lomé.

He was appointed and ordained coadjutor bishop of Kara in 2008 and bishop of Kara in 2009, following the resignation of his predecessor Ignace Baguibassa Sambar-Talkena.

Notes

1961 births
Togolese Roman Catholic bishops
Living people
Roman Catholic bishops of Kara
21st-century Togolese people
University of Lomé alumni